Gary Lee Littrell (born October 26, 1944) is a retired United States Army command sergeant major who, while serving as an adviser to Army of the Republic of Vietnam's Ranger units during the Vietnam War, acted with extraordinary courage during a four-day siege on his battalion, for which he was awarded the Medal of Honor.

Medal of Honor action
Between April 4 and April 8, 1970, while serving on Advisory Team 21 of I Corps Advisory Group, in Kontum Province, Republic of Vietnam, Sergeant First Class Littrell was a Light Weapons Infantry Advisor with the 23rd Battalion, 2nd Ranger Group. The battalion was under intense mortar attack — all advisors except Littrell were killed. Unrelentingly, over four days, Littrell kept the battalion inspired, while he directed artillery and air support, distributed ammunition, strengthened faltering defenses, cared for the wounded, and shouted encouragement to the Vietnamese in their own language. For his "sustained extraordinary courage and selflessness", he was awarded the Medal of Honor.

The Medal of Honor was presented to Littrell in a White House ceremony by President Richard Nixon on October 15, 1973.

Medal of Honor citation

Honors

In 1993, Littrell was inducted into the Ranger Hall of Fame, which serves to "honor and preserve the contributions of the most extraordinary U.S. Rangers in American history, to identify and highlight individuals as role models for current era Rangers, and to educate the public on the culture of the U.S. Army Rangers."

In later years
Littrell retired from the army in 1985 as a command sergeant major.

As of October 2019, Littrell lives in St. Pete Beach, Florida. He makes speaking appearances as part of the Medal of Honor Foundation's Character Development Program to raise public awareness about the legacy of the Medal of Honor. Addressing area high school students, for example, he extols the importance of living a virtuous life, saying, "Integrity is the most important word in the world".

See also

List of Medal of Honor recipients for the Vietnam War

References

 (Details Littrell's Medal of Honor action)

Further reading

External links
 (Four Medal of Honor recipients, including Littrell, visit troops in Afghanistan.)

1944 births
Living people
United States Army personnel of the Vietnam War
United States Army Medal of Honor recipients
Recipients of the Legion of Merit
Recipients of the Gallantry Cross (Vietnam)
People from Henderson, Kentucky
United States Army non-commissioned officers
Recipients of the Air Medal
Vietnam War recipients of the Medal of Honor